Tremellogaster is a fungal genus in the Diplocystaceae family. A monotypic genus, it contains the single species Tremellogaster surinamensis, known from Suriname and Guyana.

References

Boletales
Fungi described in 1924
Fungi of South America
Monotypic Boletales genera